Antignac is a commune in the Cantal department in the Auvergne region of south-central France.

The inhabitants of the commune are known as Antignacois or Antignacoises

Geography
Antignac lies in the valley of the Sumène some 80 km south-west of Clermont-Ferrand and 10 km north-west of Riom-ès-Montagnes in the Canton of Saignes. Access to the commune is by road D3 from Riom-ès-Montagnes in the south-east continuing west to join the D922.

Antignac is the main village in the commune which includes 25 other hamlets and localities:

Le Beix
Bellot
La Bouboulie
La Broconie
Les Buges Blanches
La Cavarache
Le Cellier
Le Chambon
Le Châtelet
La Croix de Soleilhadoux
Drulh
Fouillade
Fourgoux
La Ganette
Lugue
Masternat
Saleix
Salsignac
Sauronnet
La Seppe
Tampagniergues
Urlande
La Valette
Vignon
Vignonnet

The river Rhue forms all of the commune's northern border.

Neighbouring communes and villages

Administration
List of Successive Mayors

Population

Culture and heritage

Civil heritage
The commune has many buildings and structures that are registered as historical monuments:
Farmhouses (18th-19th century) The Farmhouse at La Broconie contains Furniture which is registered as historical objects.

Houses (16th-20th century)

Houses and Farms (16th-20th century)
A Farmhouse and Mill at le Soulou (19th century)
The Grange du Pré de L'Oiseau Stables (19th century)
The Wolf Trapping Pits at Urlande bas (19th century)
The former School (1882) The School contains several religious items that are registered as historical objects.
The Salsignac Railway Viaduct (20th century) on the stretch from Bort-les-Organs to Riom-ès-Montagnes  on the Paris-Béziers railway line was commissioned on 2 December 1907 and closed in 1991. The viaduct is 190m long with 14 arches and is 24m high.
The Barn-Stables at Le Beix (1878)

The Town Hall contains a War Memorial (1924) that is registered as an historical object.

Other sites of interest
The Chateau of Longuevergne

Religious heritage
The commune has several religious buildings and structures that are registered as historical monuments:
The Church of Saint-Étienne and Saint-Ferréol de Salsignac (12th century). Also called the Chapel Notre-Dame-du-Bon-Secours de Salsignac, this small Romanesque church was built in the 12th century and rebuilt in the Gothic style between 1469 and 1496. The bell located in a tiny bell tower dates from 1657. The Church contains many items that are registered as historical objects:
The Furniture in the Church
A Processional Banner (20th century)
A Statue: Saint Louis (19th century)
A Statue: Saint Ferréol of Vienne (19th century)
A Statue: Virgin and child (19th century)
A Stoup (16th century)
A Tabernacle (17th century)
A Monumental Painting (19th century)
The Parish church of Saint-Victor and Saint-Pierre-ès-Liens (12th century). The apse and the choir are the only parts dating from the 12th century, the nave and the chapels were rebuilt or upgraded in the 18th and 19th centuries. The Church contains many items that are registered as historical objects:
The Furniture in the Chapel
A Chalice (18th century)
An Alb (20th century)
2 Processional Banners (20th century)
The Saint-Pierre Bell (1472)
A Stoup (1753)
2 Statues: Saints Peter and Paul (18th century)
2 Statues: Adoring Angels (18th century)
Retables and Altar Paintings (18th century)
2 Altar Paintings (19th century)
A Painting: Saint Peter delivered by an Angel (18th century)
A Monumental Painting (18th century)
A Statue: Saint Paul (17th century)
A Statue: Saint Peter (17th century)
The Chapel of Notre-Dame du Roc-Vignonnet (ruins) (12th century). Begun in the early 12th century and completed in the 13th and 14th centuries, the chapel was finally abandoned in the 19th century. The Chapel contains some items that are registered as historical objects:
14 Capitals and 13 Bases (11th century)
33 Corbels (11th century)
Monumental Crosses (19th-20th century)
The Presbytery contains a Wardrobe (1807) that is registered as an historical object.

Environmental heritage
Two sites are registered as historical monuments:
The Clairière médiévale des Roussilloux Park (Middle Ages)
The Jardin Ethnobotanique Botanic Garden (20th century)

Antignac Picture Gallery

Notable people linked to the commune
Jean Dutourd (born 14 January 1920 in Paris, where he died 17 January 2011), journalist and writer of the French Academy, author of the novel Au Bon Beurre, grandson of the House of Laurichesse at the Auberge de la Sumène d'Antignac. Became famous for his participation in the radio program Les grosses têtes (The big heads) presented by Philippe Bouvard.
Jacques Jouve, born 10 March 1932 at Antignac. Communist MP for Haute-Vienne from 19 March 1978 to 22 May 1981.
François-Paul Raynal (1902-1964), journalist at L'Auvergnat de Paris and writer, remained very attached to his roots and family home at Salsignac which he mentions in several of his novels and stories (Au fil de la Sumène, Les Artisans du village, Marie des Solitudes, etc.).
François Aubert, mason, who decorated his house in a naive style (close to the ideal palace of Ferdinand Cheval) and created a mineralogical museum.

See also
Communes of the Cantal department

References

External links
 Antignac on the National Geographic Institute website 
Antignac on Géoportail, National Geographic Institute (IGN) website 
Antignac on the 1750 Cassini Map

Communes of Cantal